Gonzalo Curbelo (born April 24, 1987 in Montevideo, Uruguay) is a Uruguayan footballer who last played for El Tanque Sisley in the Uruguayan Primera División.

Teams
  Sud América 2007–2010
  Montevideo Wanderers 2010–2011
  El Tanque Sisley 2011–2012

References
 Profile at BDFA 
 
 Profile at Tenfield Digital 

1987 births
Living people
Uruguayan footballers
Montevideo Wanderers F.C. players
El Tanque Sisley players

Association football midfielders